The Rognon is an 18.8 km long river in Haute-Saône department, eastern France. It rises in Magny-Danigon and flows generally southwest to join the Scey in Beveuge. Its tributaries include the Clairegoutte and the Fau.

References

Rivers of Haute-Saône
Rivers of Bourgogne-Franche-Comté
Rivers of France